Trixa conspersa is a species of fly in the family Tachinidae. It is generally found in the meadows, hedgerows and woodland edge in Britain, around the month of May to the end of July.

References

Diptera of Europe
Dexiinae
Insects described in 1776
Taxa named by Moses Harris